1935 Országos Bajnokság I (men's water polo) was the 29th water polo championship in Hungary. There were eight teams who played one-round match for the title.

Final list 

* M: Matches W: Win D: Drawn L: Lost G+: Goals earned G-: Goals got P: Point

2. Class 
Budapest: 1. BSE 16, 2. NSC 10, 3. MUE 7, 4. BBTE 7, 5. VAC 0 point.

Eastern Division: Szolnoki MÁV 10, 2. Orosházi UE 9, 3. Egri TE 5, 4. Jászapáti Összetartás SE 0 point.

Western Division:  1. Tatabányai SC 6, 2. Győri UE 5, 3. Pécsi AC 1 point.

Final: 1. BSE, 2. Tatabányai SC, 3. Szolnoki MÁV.

Sources 
Gyarmati Dezső: Aranykor (Hérodotosz Könyvkiadó és Értékesítő Bt., Budapest, 2002.)
Magyar Sport Almanach 1935

1935 in water polo
1935 in Hungarian sport
Seasons in Hungarian water polo competitions